Kareen may refer to:
An American female name which means Pure.
A German female name which means Pure.
Kareen also means flower, anchor, beloved.
A Greek variant of the female given name Karen
Qareen, a sort of personal demon in Islam
A type of Sidhe, a creature in Irish mythology
An Israeli variant of the Browning Hi-Power semiautomatic pistol

See also

Karien
Karin (disambiguation)